The 1981 Cupa României Final was the 43rd final of Romania's most prestigious cup competition. The final was played at the Stadionul Republicii in Bucharest on 24 June 1981 and was contested between Divizia A sides Universitatea Craiova and Politehnica Timişoara. The cup was won by Craiova.

Route to the final

Match details

References

External links
 Official site 

Cupa Romaniei Final, 1981
1981
CS Universitatea Craiova matches
FC Politehnica Timișoara matches